Jonathan Skinner is a British author, journalist, and Baptist minister. He is also a minister at Widcombe Baptist Church in Bath, England. He has worked for the Universities and Colleges Christian Fellowship (UCCF).

Skinner is a writer for the Evangelical Times, which is a monthly newspaper published in Britain and circulated around the world, with a readership of over 40,000 1. He writes on faith, social issues, politics, and religion.

Skinner has a BSc degree in biochemistry and has taught science, working with students and discussing issues of science and faith.

Skinner is married with four children, named Elizabeth, Thomas, Henry and Susannah.

Articles
 Is death the end?
 Hostage in Iraq
 Has Father Christmas upstaged Jesus?
 Shopping for God

Books
 The Edge of Known Reality and Beyond, 2005, Evangelical Press

External links
 The Edge of Known Reality
 Widcombe Baptist Church Bath
 The Evangelical Times
 Evangelical Press - Book info and sample chapter
 Independent book review

Christian writers
English male journalists
English non-fiction writers
English Baptist ministers
Year of birth missing (living people)
Living people
English male non-fiction writers